Cumia mestayerae is a species of sea snail, a marine gastropod mollusk in the family Colubrariidae. It can reach up to 30 mm in length.

Description
The shell size varies between 20 mm and  30 mm

Distribution
This species is distributed in the seas along Southern Australia and New Zealand.

References

External links
 

Colubrariidae
Gastropods described in 1915